Alexander Henry Scrymgeour, 12th Earl of Dundee,  (born 5 June 1949), is a Scottish peer, Conservative politician and Chief of the Clan Scrymgeour.

Born on 5 June 1949, Dundee is the son of Henry Scrymgeour-Wedderburn, 11th Earl of Dundee, and Patricia Montagu Douglas Scott. He was educated at Ludgrove School and Eton College before attending the University of St Andrews. He was a Page of Honour to Queen Elizabeth II.

Lord Scrymgeour's first active experience as a Conservative politician was as the party's candidate in the Hamilton by-election in 1978. He has sat in the House of Lords since his father's death in 1983, and served as a Lord-in-waiting (Conservative Party whip in the House of Lords) from 1986 to 1989. He served as Government Spokesperson for Education (1986–1988), Government Spokesperson for Scottish Affairs (1986–1989), Government Spokesperson for Home Affairs and for Energy from (1987–1989). He was made an elected hereditary peer (as Earl of Dundee) in 1999.

He has served as the UK delegate to the Organization for Security and Co-operation in Europe from 1992 to 1997. He was also a member of the Parliamentary Assembly of the Council of Europe and the Western European parliament from 1992 to 1999. The Earl is honorary consul for Croatia in Edinburgh, and is decorated with the Order of Prince Branimir. The Dundee Trust works on the Dalmatian coast in Croatia on behalf of DFID to distribute humanitarian aid to some of the poorest people in the Balkans.

A farmer of thirty years' experience, Lord Dundee's Farming Company manages some 2000 acres over the counties of Fife and Angus. Dundee has sat in the House since 1983 where he has exercised his privileges on a number of agriculture and environmental standing committees. Most recently his interests have turned to health questions.

Lord Dundee is also the Hereditary Royal Standard Bearer of Scotland, Constable of Dundee, and Chief of the Name and Arms of Scrymgeour. He is a member of the New Club, Edinburgh and Whites, in London.

Family
Lord Dundee married Siobhan Mary (died 11 March 2019), daughter of David Llewellyn of 41 Cleveland Square, London, and Great Somerford, Wiltshire, on 19 July 1979. They have four children:

Lady Marina Patricia Scrymgeour (born 21 August 1980)
Henry David Scrymgeour-Wedderburn, Viscount Dudhope (born 20 June 1982).
Lady Flora Hermione Vera Scrymgeour (born 3 November 1985).
Lady Lavinia Rebecca Elizabeth Scrymgeour (born 1986).

References

External links

Alexander Scrymgeour, 12th Earl of Dundee

1949 births
Living people
People educated at Eton College
Alumni of the University of St Andrews
Earls of Dundee
Conservative Party (UK) Baronesses- and Lords-in-Waiting
Deputy Lieutenants of Fife
Place of birth missing (living people)
People educated at Ludgrove School
Hereditary peers elected under the House of Lords Act 1999